Metateratocephalidae is a family of nematodes belonging to the order Plectida.

Genera:
 Metateratocephalus Eroshenko, 1973
 Steratocephalus Andrássy, 1984

References

Nematodes